First Language is a peer-reviewed academic journal that publishes papers three times a year in the field of language. The journal's editor is Chloë Marshall (University of London) who has taken over at the start of 2017 from longtime editor Kevin Durkin (University of Strathclyde). It has been in publication since 1980 and is currently published by SAGE Publishing. The journal is also a member of the Committee on Publication Ethics.

Scope 
First Language focuses on original research in child language acquisition. The journal is multidisciplinary, containing research from diverse theoretical and methodological origins. First Language contains papers from a range of disciplines such as linguistics, anthropology and neuroscience.

Abstracting and indexing 
First Language is abstracted and indexed in the following databases:
 Academic Premier
 British Education Index
 Educational Research Abstracts Online
SCOPUS
Special Education Needs Abstracts

References

External links 
 

SAGE Publishing academic journals
English-language journals
Linguistics journals
Neuroscience journals
Language acquisition